Remain EP is an EP by José González, released in early 2004. All songs were written by González, except "Love Will Tear Us Apart", which was written by Joy Division.

Track listing
"Remain" – 3:46
"Lovestain" – 2:18
"Love Will Tear Us Apart" (Joy Division cover) – 3:04
"Suggestions" – 2:39

2004 EPs
José González (singer) EPs